The Drajna is a left tributary of the river Teleajen in Romania. It discharges into the Teleajen in Piatra. It flows through the villages Slon, Valea Lespezii, Cerașu, Valea Borului, Podurile, Drajna, Pițigoi and Drajna de Jos.

References

Rivers of Romania
Rivers of Prahova County